Puncturella exquisita is a species of sea snail, a marine gastropod mollusk in the family Fissurellidae, the keyhole limpets.

Description
The size of the shell varies between 5 mm and 12 mm.

Distribution
This species occurs in the Red Sea and the Indian Ocean; also off the Philippines.

References

 Taylor, J.D. (1973). Provisional list of the mollusca of Aldabra Atoll
 Poppe G.T. & Tagaro S.P. (2020). The Fissurellidae from the Philippines with the description of 26 new species. Visaya. suppl. 13: 1-131

External links
 Adams, A. (1853). A monograph of the recent species of Rimula, a genus of Mollusca, belonging to the family Fissurellidae. Proceedings of the Zoological Society of London. (1851) 19: 226-227

Fissurellidae
Gastropods described in 1851